The Daily News is an American, English language daily newspaper headquartered in Jacksonville, North Carolina. It has served the city of Jacksonville, Marine Corps Base Camp Lejeune, and the surrounding parts of Onslow County including, Richlands, Swansboro, Sneads Ferry, Holly Ridge, and North Topsail since 1953.

Sunday circulation is approximately 9,000, while M-Sat. circulation is roughly 7,000.

History 
The Daily News was founded in either 1953 or 1954.   The Daily News was owned by Freedom Communications until 2012, when Freedom sold its Florida and North Carolina papers including JD News in Jacksonville, Free Press in Kinston and the Sun Journal In New Bern to Halifax Media Group. Halifax Media Group owned a total of 36 newspapers which were acquired in 2015, by GateHouse.

It was a broadsheet-format daily until June 1, 2009, when it and two sister dailies, the Sun Journal and the Kinston Free Press converted to a berliner-style format. Since the format change, all three papers are laid out and published in Jacksonville.

In November of 2022 Paxton Media Group acquired the Jacksonville Daily News and five other North Carolina newspapers from Gannett Co., Inc.

Awards
The paper is a member of the North Carolina Publishing Association.  The paper has won many awards from the North Carolina Press Association. In 2019, the paper won first place in News Enterprise Reporting, (Kelsey Stiglitz and Amanda Thames for their story on child abuse. in the daily newspapers under 12,500 circulation category. The paper also won first place in Religion and Faith Reporting, for their article on faith leaders.

The paper won first place in Education Reporting in 2017, for reporter Jannette Pippin's story on school choice.

See also
 List of newspapers in North Carolina

References

Jacksonville, North Carolina
Daily newspapers published in North Carolina
Newspapers established in 1953
Daily newspapers published in the United States
Gannett publications
1953 establishments in North Carolina